The Elan d'or Award Special Prize is an award presented at the Elan d'or Awards in Japan. This award was first presented in 1972, and was discontinued after 2014.

References

External links
 

Awards established in 1972
Japanese film awards
Recurring events established in 1972
1972 establishments in Japan
Lists of films by award